Kumara is a surname. Notable people with the surname include:

Ajith Kumara (born 1973), Sri Lankan politician
Dinesh Kumara (born 1983), Sri Lankan cricketer
Malith Kumara (born 1989), Sri Lankan cricketer
Manjula Kumara (born 1984), Sri Lankan high jumper
Pradeep Kumara (born 1972), Sri Lankan cricketer
Prasad Kumara (born 1978), Sri Lankan cricketer
Rohan Pradeep Kumara (born 1975), Sri Lankan athlete
Yoshan Kumara (born 1990), Sri Lankan cricketer
Surnames of Sri Lankan origin